Parapara may refer to:

 Parapara, Guárico, a Venezuelan town
 Parapara, Northland, a locality in the Northland Region of New Zealand
 Parapara, Tasman, a locality in the Tasman Region of New Zealand
 Para Para, a Japanese synchronized dance style
Pisonia brunoniana, the New Zealand Parapara tree
 Para, para'-Diaminodiphenyl-methane, a chemical compound
 PallaPalla, a member of the Amazoness Quartet from Sailor Moon, who was known as ParaPara in the original English dub